Bodhraj Acharya (born April 21, 1977) is a Nepalese born American professional, working in the field of laboratory medicine, Cell Biology and chemistry. He has received many honors, grants and travel fellowships in United States and other countries. He has published patents, abstracts and articles in the field. He had worked previously as a clinical laboratory manager at the cardiac hospital in Nepal.

Prizes and honours
1997, 1999 Merit scholarship to study Medical Laboratory Technology at Institute of Medicine, Tribhuvan University
2005 Gallwas membership Grant, AACC 
2005 International travel grant, AACC 
2006 Young Achievers award
2007 International Travel Grant, AACC
2007 International Travel Grant, Asian & Pacific Federation of Clinical Biochemistry (APFCB)
2008 KNU Honors Scholarship to study master's degree
2010 KNU Honors Scholarship to study PhD in biomedical sciences
2012 Featured member of AACC, interview published at AACC website
2013 KNU best poster award
2014 KNU Cell Matrix Research Institute Winter Seminar Award

Professional membership
2001–Present Life Member, Nepal Association for Medical Laboratory Sciences
2005–2014 Gallwas Member, American Association of Clinical Chemistry (AACC)
2008–present Korean Tissue Engineering and Regenerative Medicine Society
2010-2011 Korean Society Biochemistry and Molecular Biology

Publication
Book - Health Post Laboratory Technique (for rural areas in Nepal)

References

1977 births
Living people
Nepalese scientists
People from Chitwan District
Khas people